Sonia Eubanks Barker is a Republican member of the Arkansas House of Representatives, representing the 7th district which contains parts of Union, Ouachita, and Calhoun counties. Barker was elected to the state house in 2016. Prior to her election, Barker worked as an educator.

Biography
Barker graduated with honors from Southern Arkansas University. She then proceeded to work as a high school teacher in Smackover.

In 2015, incumbent Democrat state representative John Blaine announced his retirement. Barker announced her candidacy and ran unopposed in the Republican primary. She won the November 2016 general election, after defeating Democrat Floyd Thomas, Jr. and independent candidate Glenn Glover. She took office in January 2017.

Barker was re-elected to a second term in the 2018 election. She is currently seeking another term in the 2020 election. She faces Democrat George Calloway Jr.

Barker is married to John and they have three children. They reside in Smackover. Barker is a member of the town's First Baptist Church.

References

External links
Official website
Sonia Eubanks Barker at Arkansas House of Representatives
Profile at Vote Smart

Living people
Year of birth missing (living people)
Republican Party members of the Arkansas House of Representatives
21st-century American politicians